WIM may refer to:

 Wim, a personal name
 World Islamic Mission an international Islamic organization
 Woman International Master, a chess title
 Weigh in motion, a system for collecting vehicle weights while in motion.
 WAP Identity Module, an identification protocol defined in the Wireless Application Protocol standard
 Wimbledon station, UK
 Windows Imaging Format, a file-based disk image format
 Woe, Is Me, a 7-member rock band from Atlanta

See also
 WIMS (disambiguation)
 Whim (disambiguation)